Oreoglanis is a genus of fish in the family Sisoridae native to Asia. These fish live in fast-flowing streams in China, mainland Southeast Asia and the Indian subcontinent. They are mainly distributed in the Mekong, upper Salween and Irrawaddy River drainages. They range from the Brahmaputra basin to the Lam River drainage in central Vietnam. They are easily distinguished from other catfishes by their strongly depressed head and body and greatly enlarged paired fins that have been modified to form an adhesive apparatus. The flattened shape of these fish and the large pectoral and pelvic fins provide essential adhesion in the fast-flowing waters they live in.

Taxonomy
The taxonomy of this group is currently under discussion and changes seem inevitable as the group is suspected to be non-monophyletic. Based on morphology, Oreoglanis has been divided into two species groups. According to the original description of these groups, the O. siamensis species group is distinguished by having an emarginate caudal fin, and a lower lip notched medially with an entire or weakly laciniate posterior margin, while the O. delacouri species group is distinguished by having a lunate caudal fin and a lower lip without a median notch with prominent extensions along the posterior margin. It has been suggested that only the marginal morphology of lower lip can be employed to recognize the two species groups.

Species
There are currently 24 recognized species in this genus:
 Oreoglanis colurus Vidthayanon, Saenjundaeng & H. H. Ng, 2009
 Oreoglanis delacouri (Pellegrin, 1936)
 Oreoglanis frenata H. H. Ng & Rainboth, 2001
 Oreoglanis heteropogon Vidthayanon, Saenjundaeng & H. H. Ng, 2009
 Oreoglanis hponkanensis X. Y. Chen, T. Qin & Z. Y. Chen, 2017 
 Oreoglanis hypsiura H. H. Ng & Kottelat, 1999
 Oreoglanis immaculata D. P. Kong, X. Y. Chen & J. X. Yang, 2007
 Oreoglanis infulata H. H. Ng & Freyhof, 2001
 Oreoglanis insignis H. H. Ng & Rainboth, 2001
 Oreoglanis jingdongensis D. P. Kong, X. Y. Chen & J. X. Yang, 2007
 Oreoglanis laciniosa Vidthayanon, Saenjundaeng & H. H. Ng, 2009
 Oreoglanis lepturus H. H. Ng & Rainboth, 2001
 Oreoglanis macronemus H. H. Ng, 2004
 Oreoglanis macroptera (Vinciguerra, 1890)
 Oreoglanis majuscula Linthoingambi & Vishwanath, 2011 
 Oreoglanis nakasathiani Vidthayanon, Saenjundaeng & H. H. Ng, 2009
Oreoglanis omkoiense Suvarnaraksha, 2020
 Oreoglanis pangenensis Sinha & Tamang, 2015 
 Oreoglanis setigera H. H. Ng & Rainboth, 2001
 Oreoglanis siamensis H. M. Smith, 1933
 Oreoglanis sudarai Vidthayanon, Saenjundaeng & H. H. Ng, 2009
 Oreoglanis suraswadii Vidthayanon, Saenjundaeng & H. H. Ng, 2009
 Oreoglanis tenuicauda Vidthayanon, Saenjundaeng & H. H. Ng, 2009
 Oreoglanis vicina Vidthayanon, Saenjundaeng & H. H. Ng, 2009

References

 
Sisoridae
Catfish genera
Freshwater fish genera
Taxa named by Hugh McCormick Smith